The 1958 All-Ireland Senior Football Championship Final was the 71st All-Ireland Final and the deciding match of the 1958 All-Ireland Senior Football Championship, an inter-county Gaelic football tournament for the top teams in Ireland.

Dublin won comfortably over Derry, appearing in their first final, with goals by Owen Gribben and Paddy Farnan.

References

All-Ireland Senior Football Championship Final
All-Ireland Senior Football Championship Final
All-Ireland Senior Football Championship Final, 1958
All-Ireland Senior Football Championship Finals
All-Ireland Senior Football Championship Finals
Derry county football team matches
Dublin county football team matches